The Reverend Colman E. O'Flaherty (24 April 1878 – 3 October 1918), was an Irish-born American Catholic military chaplain and a recipient of the Distinguished Service Cross during World War I.

Early life
O'Flaherty was born in Carraroe, Ireland. He received his early education in Ireland and continued his studies at Lyons, France where he became fluent in French and at Montreal, Canada. He was ordained a Roman Catholic priest at Sioux Falls on 15 September 1901 and spent the next nine years at Chamberlain and Kimball during which time he was responsible for the construction of seven church buildings including Columbus College at Chamberlain. In 1910 he was appointed to take charge of the Holy Family Church at Mitchell where he was instrumental in the development of Notre Dame Academy in Mitchell, South Dakota.

Military career
He joined the American Expeditionary Force and was sent to France during World War I and served as an Army chaplain with the 28th Infantry, 1st Infantry Division. He was killed in action by shellfire on 3 October 1918. He was posthumously awarded the Distinguished Service Cross, the citation of which read: For extraordinary heroism near Very, France, Chaplin O'Flaherty displayed conspicuous gallantry in administering to the wounded under terrific fire, exposing himself at all times to reach their sides, and give them aid. In the performance of this work, he was killed.

Notable family
He was the older brother of Mayor of Galway Michael O'Flaherty (elected 1950) and uncle of Mayor of Galway Patrick O'Flaherty (born 1928, elected 1964).

References 

 Origin of the Surname O'Flaherty, Anthony Matthews, Dublin, 1968, p. 40.

19th-century Irish Roman Catholic priests
People from County Galway
1878 births
1918 deaths
Irish people of World War I
American military personnel killed in World War I
Recipients of the Distinguished Service Cross (United States)
World War I chaplains
United States Army chaplains
Irish emigrants to the United States (before 1923)
20th-century Irish Roman Catholic priests
20th-century American clergy
19th-century American clergy